The 2019 Ladbrokes Players Championship Finals was the twelfth edition of the PDC darts tournament, which sees the top 64 players from the 30 Players Championship events of 2019 taking part. The tournament took place from 22–24 November 2019 at Butlin's Resort in Minehead.

Daryl Gurney was the defending champion after defeating Michael van Gerwen 11–9 in the 2018 competition, but he lost 6–5 in the first round to Luke Woodhouse.

Van Gerwen hit the first televised nine-dart finish in over a year in his second round victory over Adrian Lewis.

Van Gerwen went on to become Players Champion for the fifth time, beating Gerwyn Price 11–9 in the final.

Prize money
The 2019 Players Championship Finals will have a total prize fund of £500,000, an increase from the £460,000 available in 2018.

The following is the breakdown of the fund:

Qualification
The top 64 players from the Players Championships Order of Merit qualify, which is solely based on prize money won in the thirty Players Championships events during the season:

Top 64 in the Players Championship Order of Merit

Draw
There was no draw held, all players were put in a fixed bracket by their seeding positions.

Finals

Top half

Section 1

Section 2

Bottom half

Section 3

Section 4

References

Players Championship Finals
Players
Players
Minehead
Sports competitions in Somerset
2010s in Somerset
Players